Marilynn Louise Smith (April 13, 1929 – April 9, 2019) was an American professional golfer. She was one of the thirteen founders of the LPGA in 1950. She won two major championships and 21 LPGA Tour events in all. She is a member of the World Golf Hall of Fame.

Amateur career
Smith was born in Topeka, Kansas. She started playing golf at age 12. She was a three-time winner of the Kansas State Amateur from 1946-48. She won the 1949 national individual intercollegiate golf championship while attending the University of Kansas.

Professional career
Smith turned pro in 1949 and joined the Spalding staff. She was one of the thirteen women who founded the LPGA in 1950. She won her first tournament in 1952 at the Fort Wayne Open. She would go on to win a total of 21 events on the LPGA Tour, including two major championships, the 1963 and 1964 Titleholders Championships. She finished in the top ten on the money list nine times between 1961 and 1972, with her best finishes being fourth places in 1963, 1968 and 1970. She was named the LPGA Most Improved Player in 1963. She was the LPGA's president from 1958 to 1960. She was selected for membership of the World Golf Hall of Fame in the Lifetime Achievement category in June 2006 and was inducted in October 2006.

While playing at a tournament in Florida, Smith escaped uninjured when a sniper fired several shots at her and Margie Masters. The perpetrator was never identified. Both Masters and Smith ultimately made the cut. 

In 1973 she became the first woman to work on a men's golf television broadcast.

She died on April 9, 2019, four days before her 90th birthday, from complications of an infection due to a fall during the week of The Founders Cup in Phoenix.

Professional wins (23)

LPGA Tour wins (21)
1954 (1) Fort Wayne Open
1955 (2) Heart of America Open, Mile High Open
1958 (1) Jacksonville Open
1959 (1) Memphis Open
1962 (2) Sunshine Open, Waterloo Open
1963 (4) Titleholders Championship, Peach Blossom Open, Eugene Ladies' Open, Cavern City Open
1964 (2) Titleholders Championship, Albuquerque Pro-Am
1965 (1) Peach Blossom Open
1966 (2) St. Petersburg Women's Open, Louise Suggs Delray Beach Invitational
1967 (2) St. Petersburg Orange Classic, Babe Zaharias Open
1968 (1) O'Sullivan Open
1970 (1) Women's Golf Charities Open
1972 (1) Pabst Ladies Classic

LPGA majors are shown in bold.

Other wins (2)
1957 Hot Springs 4-Ball (with Fay Crocker)
1962 Naples Pro-Am (with Mickey Wright)

Major championships

Wins (2)

1 In an 18-hole playoff, Smith 72, Wright 73

See also
List of golfers with most LPGA Tour wins

References

External links

American female golfers
LPGA Tour golfers
Winners of LPGA major golf championships
World Golf Hall of Fame inductees
Golfers from Kansas
University of Kansas alumni
Sportspeople from Topeka, Kansas
1929 births
2019 deaths
21st-century American women